Electronic referendum (or E-referendum) is a referendum in which voting is aided by electronic means. E-referendum employs information and communication technology such as the Internet (I-voting) or digital telephones, rather than a classical ballot box system. Traditionally, e-referendum is organised by governmental bodies but nowadays, there even exist private companies which can facilitate online referendums or other types of e-voting.

Advantages 
As other types of e-elections, an electronic referendum provides a more convenient option of casting a vote for citizens since it is less time-consuming and can be performed without attending an official voting place. Generally, it has also been assumed to lead to a higher voter turnout and an increase in the citizens’ political engagement; however, this is not always the case as the example of Switzerland shows. E-referendum also renders the referendum voting more accessible to those living abroad and to disabled people. See more in e-elections.

Potential Issues 
Similarly to other e-elections, electronic referendums require higher Internet and computer skills. Furthermore, when it comes to manipulation of personal data using ICT, trust in the governmental or other agencies facilitating the referendum voting is crucial. See more in e-elections.

E-referendum in the years 
Taking into account the European context, it is possible to state that the adoption of e-referendum is little widespread and uncommon. 

The Italian seaside town Ladispoli is a pioneer in this field: in 2004 it held three e-referendum. They concerned the protection of archaeological sites, participatory budgeting and the involvement of immigrants in political life. The adoption of the electronic mean was part of "E-poll": a European Union project dedicated to the experimentation of electronic voting. This pilot project took place also in other four Italian cities: Avellino, Campobasso, Specchia and Cremona. In the case of Ladispoli, the vote was open to all the 24.000 citizens and 2.500 immigrants regularly registered at the municipal office. 

Lately, in 2005, e-referendum was also experimented in Tallinn, the Estonian capital city. In the same year, Spain and France experienced the e-referendum, adopting the remote i-voting and special tools respectively. 

However, Switzerland represents the only country that effectively used the electronic mean. Indeed many technological solutions have been used since 2000, so that, according to the Zurich E-voting System, even text messages were allowed.

E-referendum in practice

Switzerland: a successful case 
Following the European experience with e-referendum, Switzerland can be cited as a successful example in the practice of e-referendum. By developing different electronic systems of voting such as Geneva E-voting System or the Zurich E-voting System, Switzerland had the opportunity to enable referendum via the internet on local or even at the federal levels.

Ireland: a failed trial basis 
During the 2002 referendum on the Treaty of Nice, Ireland used electronic voting machines in seven constituencies as a trial basis. (See more in Electronic voting in the Republic of Ireland)

In 2004, the government abandoned their plans to introduce a nationwide electronic system after a report from the Independent Commission on Electronic Voting and Counting raised concerns about the reliability of the machines and the integrity of the ballot. E-voting was finally scrapped in 2009 when further reports confirmed issues over the reliability of the process and the difficulty of storage of the voting machines because of high costs

Canada: a potential user of electronic referendum 
In Canada, several initiatives in favour of electronic referendums are emerging. For instance, the founder of the Online Party of Canada, Michael Nicula, proposed a design of a “unique Interned-based referendum voting system”. 

The Canadian Citizens Party also has propositions about referendum protocols. For instance, Canadians will be able to establish an account and post policy recommendations on a platform. Other individuals will be able to sign petitions linked to the recommendations through an electronic signature.

References 

Electronic voting
Referendums